Archontophoenix myolensis, the Myola palm, is a species of flowering plant in the family Arecaceae. It is endemic to Queensland, Australia. It is threatened by habitat loss. It occurs in the Myola area and the Black Mountain in the Kuranda range in the Atherton Tablelands, Queensland. The total population is seriously threatened by habitat clearance and is estimated to contain fewer than 100 mature trees and remains unprotected. Regeneration is good.

Distribution 
Restricted to an altitudinal range of 350 to 400 m, the species occurs in riverine rainforest on metamorphic rocks on the Barron River near Kuranda, Queensland and in particular near the village of Myola. Invasive weeds have prevented the expansion of the remaining rainforest habitat. Seedlings are washed away by floods.

References 

myolensis
Palms of Australia
Vulnerable flora of Australia
Nature Conservation Act endangered biota
Vulnerable biota of Queensland
Endangered flora of Australia
Flora of Queensland
Taxonomy articles created by Polbot
Endemic flora of Queensland
Taxa named by John Leslie Dowe
Tablelands Region